Clavatoma is an extinct genus of sea snails, marine gastropod mollusks in the family Pseudomelatomidae.

Species
 † Clavatoma pulchra Powell, 1942

References

 Powell, Arthur William Baden. "The New Zealand recent and fossil Mollusca of the family Turridae with general notes on Turrid nomenclature and systematics." (1942).

 
Pseudomelatomidae
Prehistoric gastropod genera